Tom Lopienski (born June 12, 1979) is a former professional American football fullback. For two seasons, he played on the Indianapolis Colts of the National Football League (NFL).

Early life and college 
Lopienski was born on June 12, 1979 in Parkersburg, West Virginia. He played high school football at Walsh Jesuit High School in Ohio, and college football at Notre Dame.

Professional career

2003 season

Lopienski appeared in the last four games of the 2003 regular season for the Colts. On January 11, 2004 in a 38-31 divisional round victory over the Kansas City Chiefs in the 2003–04 NFL playoffs, he caught a 2-yard touchdown pass from Peyton Manning in the second quarter. Ironically, that touchdown pass would go on to be the only time Lopienski ever touched the ball during an NFL regular season or playoff game. He also played the following week in the AFC Championship Game, where the Colts lost to the New England Patriots by a score of 24-14.

2004 season

In the 2004 season, Lopienski played in the Colts’ first two regular season games. He finished his NFL career having played six total regular games.

References

1979 births
Living people
American football fullbacks
Indianapolis Colts players
Notre Dame Fighting Irish football players